Quasitetrastemma is a genus of worms belonging to the order Monostilifera, family unassigned.

The species of this genus are found in Northern Pacific Ocean.

Species:

Quasitetrastemma bicolor 
Quasitetrastemma nigrifrons 
Quasitetrastemma stimpsoni

References

Nemerteans